Baldeep Singh (born 6 February 1987 in Hoshiarpur, Punjab) is an Indian footballer who plays as a central midfielder for Prayag United in the I-League.

Currently Singh is absconding from the police and his team after he was accused, along with Jagpal Parmar and Jagpreet Singh, of participation in the rape of a child in late October 2012.

Career

JCT
Baldeep started his career at the Mahilpur Academy but soon moved on to JCT FC Academy after two years. He made his debut for JCT in 2006.

Salgaocar
Singh signed for Salgaocar S.C. of the I-League in 2011 after the 2011 AFC Asian Cup. He played for the club for one season.

Pune
On 23 June 2011 it was announced that Singh had signed for Pune F.C. in the I-League. He made his debut for the club on 8 September 2012 against East Bengal F.C. in the 2011 Indian Federation Cup; Pune lost 1–2. He was then part of the starting 11 players that started for Pune against then Premier League team Blackburn Rovers F.C. in an friendly in Pune; Blackburn won 3–0. He then made his I-League debut for the club against Shillong Lajong F.C. on 22 October 2011; the match ended 0–0.

Prayag United
On 9 May 2012 it was announced that Singh left Pune to join Prayag United S.C. of the I-League.

International
Singh made his international debut for India on 1 August 2011 during the 2008 AFC Challenge Cup against Tajikistan at the Gachibowli Athletic Stadium in Hyderabad, India. India eventually went on to win the Asian Cup and qualify for the 2011 AFC Asian Cup after a 24-year gap. He was also in the India squad during the 2009 SAFF Championship and came on as a sub in most matches, however he missed the final due to injury. Baldeep made his first international start for India on 8 October 2010 against Vietnam.

International statistics

Honours

India
 AFC Challenge Cup: 2008

India U23
SAFF Championship: 2009

References

Indian footballers
1987 births
Living people
Footballers from Hoshiarpur
I-League players
2011 AFC Asian Cup players
India international footballers
India youth international footballers
JCT FC players
Salgaocar FC players
Pune FC players
United SC players
Association football midfielders